Carlo Gesualdo da Venosa ( – 8 September 1613) was Prince of Venosa and Count of Conza. As a composer he is known for writing madrigals and pieces of sacred music that use a chromatic language not heard again until the late 19th century. He is also known for killing his first wife and her aristocratic lover upon finding them in flagrante delicto.

Biography

Early life 
Gesualdo's family had acquired the principality of Venosa in what is now the Province of Potenza, Southern Italy, in 1560. He was probably born on March 30, 1566, three years after his older brother Luigi, though some sources have stated that he was born on March 8. Older ones give the year of birth as  1560 or 1561, but this is no longer accepted. A letter from Gesualdo's mother, Geronima Borromeo, indicates that the year is most likely 1566. Gesualdo's uncle was Carlo Borromeo, later Saint Charles Borromeo. His mother was the niece of Pope Pius IV.

Most likely Carlo was born at Venosa, then part of the Kingdom of Naples, but little else is known about his early life. "His mother died when he was only seven, and at the request of his uncle, Carlo Borromeo for whom he was named, he was sent to Rome to be set on the path of an ecclesiastical career. There he was placed under the protection of his uncle, Alfonso (d. 1603), then dean of the College of Cardinals, later unsuccessful pretender to the papacy, and ultimately Archbishop of Naples." His brother Luigi was to become the next Prince of Venosa, but after his untimely death in 1584, Carlo became the designated successor. Abandoning the prospect of an ecclesiastical career, he married in 1586 his first cousin, Donna Maria d'Avalos, the daughter of Carlo d'Avalos, prince of Montesarchio and Sveva Gesualdo. They had a son, Don Emmanuele.

Gesualdo had a musical relationship with Pomponio Nenna, though whether it was student to teacher, or colleague to colleague, is uncertain. Regardless of this, however, he had a single-minded devotion to music from an early age, and showed little interest in anything else. In addition to the lute, he also played the harpsichord and guitar. In addition to Nenna, Gesualdo's accademia included the composers Giovanni de Macque, Scipione Dentice, Scipione Stella, Scipione Lacorcia, Ascanio Mayone, and the nobleman lutenist Ettorre de la Marra.

Homicide 

Some years into her marriage with Gesualdo, Donna Maria began an affair with Fabrizio Carafa, third Duke of Andria and seventh Count of Ruovo. On the night of October 16, 1590, at the Palazzo San Severo in Naples, the two lovers were caught in flagrante by Gesualdo, who killed them both on the spot.

The day after the killing, a delegation of Neapolitan officials inspected the room in Gesualdo's apartment where the killings had taken place, and interrogated witnesses. The delegation's report did not lack in gruesome details, including the mutilation of the corpses and, according to the witnesses, Gesualdo going into the bedroom a second time "because he wasn't certain yet they were dead".

The Gran Corte della Vicaria found Gesualdo had not committed a crime.

Successor 
About a year after the gruesome end of his first marriage, Gesualdo's father died and he thus became the third Prince of Venosa and eighth Count of Conza.

Ferrara years 
By 1594, Gesualdo had arranged for another marriage, this time to Leonora d'Este, the niece of Duke Alfonso II. That year, Gesualdo ventured to Ferrara, the home of the d'Este court and also one of the centers of progressive musical activity in Italy, especially the madrigal; Gesualdo was especially interested in meeting Luzzasco Luzzaschi, one of the most forward-looking composers in the genre. Leonora was married to Gesualdo and moved with him back to his estate in 1597. In the meantime, he engaged in more than two years of creative activity in the innovative environment of Ferrara, surrounded by some of the finest musicians in Italy. While in Ferrara, he published his first book of madrigals. He also worked with the concerto delle donne, the three virtuoso female singers who were among the most renowned performers in the country, and for whom many other composers wrote music.

In a letter of June 25, 1594, Gesualdo indicated he was writing music for the three women in the concerto delle donne; however, it is probable that some of the music he wrote, for example that in the newly developing monodic and/or concertato styles, has not survived.

Return to Gesualdo and final years 

After returning to his castle at Gesualdo from Ferrara in 1595, he set up a situation similar to the one that existed in Ferrara, with a group of resident virtuoso musicians who would sing his own music. While his estate became a center of music-making, it was for Gesualdo alone. With his considerable financial resources, he was able to hire singers and instrumentalists for his own pleasure. He rarely left his castle, taking delight in nothing but music. His most well-known music was published in Naples in 1603 and from the castle of Gesualdo (with printer ) in 1611. The most notoriously chromatic and difficult portions of it were all written during his period of self-isolation.

The relationship between Gesualdo and his new wife was not good; she accused him of abuse, and the Este family attempted to obtain a divorce. She spent more and more time away from the isolated estate. Gesualdo wrote many angry letters to Modena where she often went to stay with her brother. According to Cecil Gray and Peter Warlock, "She seems to have been a very virtuous lady ... for there is no record of his having killed her."

In 1600, Gesualdo's son by his second marriage died. It has been postulated that after this Gesualdo had a large painting commissioned for the church of the Capuchins at Gesualdo, showing Gesualdo, his uncle Carlo Borromeo, his second wife Leonora, and his son, underneath a group of angelic figures; however, some sources suspect the painting was commissioned earlier, as the identity of the child is unclear.

Late in life he suffered from depression. According to Campanella, writing in Lyon in 1635, Gesualdo had himself beaten daily by his servants, keeping a special servant whose duty it was to beat him "at stool", and he engaged in a relentless, and fruitless, correspondence with Cardinal Federico Borromeo to obtain relics, i.e., skeletal remains, of recently canonized uncle Carlo Borromeo, with which he hoped to obtain healing for his mental disorder and possibly absolution for his crimes. Gesualdo's late setting of Psalm 51, the Miserere, is distinguished by its insistent and imploring musical repetitions, alternating lines of monophonic chant with pungently chromatic polyphony in a low vocal tessitura.

Gesualdo died in isolation, at his castle Gesualdo in Avellino, three weeks after the death of his son Emanuele, his first son by his marriage to Maria. One 20th-century biographer has raised the possibility that he was murdered by his wife. He was buried in the chapel , in the Church of the Gesù Nuovo, in Naples. The sepulchre was destroyed in the earthquake of 1688. When the church was rebuilt, the tomb was covered over, and now lies beneath it. The burial plaque, however, remains visible.

Compositions and style 

The evidence that Gesualdo was tortured by guilt for the remainder of his life is considerable, and he may have given expression to it in his music. One of the most obvious characteristics of his music is the extravagant text setting of words representing extremes of emotion: "love", "pain", "death", "ecstasy", "agony" and other similar words occur frequently in his madrigal texts, most of which he probably wrote himself. While this type of word-painting is common among madrigalists of the late 16th century, it reached an extreme development in Gesualdo's music.

His music is among the most experimental and expressive of the Renaissance, and without question is the most wildly chromatic. Progressions such as those written by Gesualdo did not appear again in Western music until the 19th century, and then in a context of tonality.

Gesualdo's published music falls into three categories: sacred vocal music, secular vocal music, and instrumental music. His most famous compositions are his six books of madrigals, published between 1594 and 1611, as well as his Tenebrae Responsoria, which are very much like madrigals, except that they use texts from the Passion, a form (Tenebrae) used by many other composers. As in the later books of secular madrigals, he uses particularly sharp dissonance and shocking chromatic juxtapositions, especially in the parts highlighting text passages having to do with Christ's suffering, or the guilt of St. Peter in having betrayed him.

The first books of madrigals that Gesualdo published are close in style to the work of other contemporary madrigalists. Experiments with harmonic progression, cross-relation and violent rhythmic contrast increase in the later books, with Books Five and Six containing the most famous and extreme examples (for instance, the madrigals "Moro, lasso, al mio duolo" and "Beltà, poi che t'assenti", both of which are in Book Six, published in 1611). There is evidence that Gesualdo had these works in score form, in order to better display his contrapuntal inventions to other musicians, and also that Gesualdo intended his works to be sung by equal voices, as opposed to the concerted madrigal style popular in the period, which involved doubling and replacing voices with instruments. In addition to the works which he published, he left a large quantity of music in manuscript. This contains some of his richest experiments in chromaticism, as well as compositions in such contemporary avant-garde forms as monody. Some of these were products of the years he spent in Ferrara, and some were specifically written for the virtuoso singers there, the three women of the concerto di donne.

Characteristic of the Gesualdo style is a sectional format in which relatively slow-tempo passages of wild, occasionally shocking chromaticism alternate with quick-tempo diatonic passages. The text is closely wedded to the music, with individual words being given maximum attention. Some of the chromatic passages include all twelve notes of the chromatic scale within a single phrase, although scattered throughout different voices.  Gesualdo was particularly fond of chromatic third relations, for instance juxtaposing the chords of A major and F major, or even C-sharp major and A minor, as he does at the beginning of "Moro, lasso, al mio duolo".

Reception

The fascination for Gesualdo's music has been fuelled by the sensational aspects of his biography. In 2011 Alex Ross wrote in The New Yorker:

In his own lifetime, the salacious details of Gesualdo's killing of his first wife and her lover were widely publicized, including in verse by poets such as Tasso and an entire flock of Neapolitan poets, eager to capitalize on the sensation. The accounts of his cruelty were expanded with apocryphal stories such as the alleged killing of an illegitimate child of Donna Maria and her lover, which according to one variant of the made-up story was "suspended in a bassinet and swung to the point of death". Until the 1620s his music was imitated by Neapolitan composers of polyphonic madrigals such as Antonio Cifra, Michelangelo Rossi, Giovanni de Macque, Scipione Dentice, Girolamo Frescobaldi and Sigismondo d'India.

After the Renaissance Gesualdo's life story and his music were largely forgotten until the 20th century: in 1926 Gray and Warlock published their book on Gesualdo. The life of Gesualdo provided inspiration for numerous works of fiction and musical drama, including a novel by Anatole France and a short story by Julio Cortázar. Several composers responded to Gesualdo's music: In 1960 Igor Stravinsky wrote Monumentum pro Gesualdo, containing an arrangement of Gesualdo's madrigal "Beltà, poi che t'assenti". In 1995 Alfred Schnittke wrote an opera based on Gesualdo's life. Another Gesualdo opera was written by Franz Hummel in 1996. Salvatore Sciarrino arranged several of Gesualdo's madrigals for an instrumental ensemble.

Music based on Gesualdo's life and music 

Operas based on Gesualdo's life and music:
Maria di Venosa (1992) by Francesco d'Avalos.
Gesualdo (1993) by Alfred Schnittke.
Gesualdo (1998) by Franz Hummel.
The Prince of Venosa (1998) by Scott Glasgow.
Luci mie traditrici (1998) by Salvatore Sciarrino
Gesualdo (2003) by Bo Holten.
Gesualdo (2010) by Marc-André Dalbavie, lyrics by Richard Millet.

Other music inspired by Gesualdo or his music includes:
Monumentum pro Gesualdo (1960) by Igor Stravinsky
Omaggio a Gesualdo (1971) per violino e sei gruppi strumentali, by Jan van Vlijmen
Tenebrae Super Gesualdo (1972) for Alto Flute, Bass Clarinet, Cello, Glockenspiel, Guitar, Harpsichord, Marimba, Mezzo-Soprano, Viola, Violin and Celeste by Peter Maxwell Davies
Italian singer-songwriter Franco Battiato wrote and recorded a song "Gesualdo da Venosa" about him, for his 1995 album L'ombrello e la macchina da cucire. The song was remastered in 2008.
 In 1997, Australian composer Brett Dean paid homage to Gesualdo in Carlo, a work for string orchestra, tape and sampler.
Tenebre (1997) for String Orchestra by Scott Glasgow
Le voci sottovetro: Elaborazioni da Carlo Gesualdo da Venosa (1998) for voice and ensemble by Salvatore Sciarrino
In 1998 Italian jazz arranger and composer Corrado Guarino, of Bergamo, in collaboration with Livorno saxophonist Tino Tracanna, released the CD Gesualdo. The work featured arrangements from books I, IV and VI of the Madrigals.
La terribile e spaventosa storia del Principe di Venosa e della bella Maria (1999) music for l'Opera dei Pupi for voice and ensemble by Salvatore Sciarrino
Sulla morte e la follia (2004) for Violin, Violoncello and Piano by Sergio Blardony
Tenebrae (2008) by John Pickard
Mexican/British composer Hilda Paredes has arranged three madrigals from Book Six for countertenor and string quartet: "Belta, poi che t'assenti", "Arditta zanzaretta" and "Moro lasso", published by University of York Music Press, were premiered in Tokyo at the Ishibiashi Memorial Hall by countertenor Jake Arditti and the Arditti String Quartet in 2012. The quartet have continued to perform them since.
Night of Your Ascension (2015), album by experimental music collective Wrekmeister Harmonies.
The Prince of Venosa - for string quartet (2016) by Caio Facó
The Second Violinist (2017), an opera composed by Donnacha Dennehy, written and directed by Enda Walsh, in which the central character is in love with the music of Carlo Gesualdo, and with a plot that echoes his life. The score is influenced by part of Gesualdo’s motet Tristis anima mea.

Legacy 
The music State Conservatory of Potenza is named after Carlo Gesualdo da Venosa.

In The Doors of Perception (1954), Aldous Huxley writes of Gesualdo's madrigals:

Mozart's C-Minor Piano Concerto was interrupted after the first movement, and a recording of some madrigals by Gesualdo took its place.

'These voices' I said appreciatively, 'these voices – they're a kind of bridge back to the human world.'

And a bridge they remained even while singing the most startlingly chromatic of the mad prince's compositions. Through the uneven phrases of the madrigals, the music pursued its course, never sticking to the same key for two bars together. In Gesualdo, that fantastic character out of a Webster melodrama, psychological disintegration had exaggerated, had pushed to the extreme limit, a tendency inherent in modal as opposed to fully tonal music. The resulting works sounded as though they might have been written by the later Schoenberg.

'And yet,' I felt myself constrained to say, as I listened to these strange products of a Counter-reformation psychosis working upon a late medieval art form, 'and yet it does not matter that he's all in bits. The whole is disorganized. But each individual fragment is in order, is a representative of a Higher Order. The Highest Order prevails even in the disintegration. The totality is present even in the broken pieces. More clearly present, perhaps, than in a completely coherent work. At least you aren't lulled into a sense of false security by some merely human, merely fabricated order. You have to rely on your immediate perception of the ultimate order. So in a certain sense disintegration may have its advantages. But of course it's dangerous, horribly dangerous. Suppose you couldn't get back, out of the chaos...'

David Pownall's play Music to Murder By (1976) juxtaposes the life of Gesualdo with that of twentieth-century composer Peter Warlock. In 1985 the French writer Michel Breitman published the novel  based on the latter part of the life of Gesualdo. In 1995, Werner Herzog directed the film Gesualdo: Death for Five Voices about the life and music of Gesualdo.

In the NME musician Anna Calvi named Gesualdo as one of her ultimate cult heroes:

Score editions
 Carlo Gesualdo: Madrigali a cinque voci (Libro Quinto – Libro Sesto), Edizione critica a cura di Maria Caraci Vela e Antonio Delfino, testi poetici a cura di Nicola Panizza, con uno scritto di Francesco Saggio, prefazione di Giuseppe Mastrominico, La Stamperia del Principe Gesualdo, Gesualdo, 2013.

Recordings 
Gesualdo's madrigals and his Tenebrae Responsoria are often recorded.

Madrigals

 Gesualdo, Madrigaux. Les Arts Florissants: Harmonia Mundi France CD 901268 (selection from madrigal books 4–6)
 Gesualdo, Complete Sacred Music for Five Voices. Oxford Camerata, Jeremy Summerly: Naxos 8.550742
 Gesualdo, Madrigali Libri I-III. Gesualdo Consort Amsterdam: CPO 777 138–2
 Carlo Gesualdo de Verona, "The Complete Madrigals" [Libri I-VI]. 7 discs. Marco Longhini & Delitiæ Musicæ. Naxos 8507013.
 Gesualdo, "Madrigali a 5 voci" Books 1-6 [Complete] 6 discs. Quintetto Vocale Italiano Newton Classics 8802136
 Gesualdo, Madrigali, Libro I. The Kassiopeia Quintet: GLO5221 (only complete edition of Gesualdo's madrigals currently available)
 Gesualdo, Madrigali, Libro II. The Kassiopeia Quintet: GLO5222
 Gesualdo, Madrigali, Libro III. The Kassiopeia Quintet: GLO5223
 Gesualdo, Madrigali, Libro IV. The Kassiopeia Quintet: GLO5224
 Gesualdo, Madrigali, Libro V. The Kassiopeia Quintet: GLO5225
 Gesualdo, Madrigali, Libro VI. The Kassiopeia Quintet: GLO5226
 Gesualdo, Quarto Libro di Madrigali. La Venexiana: Glossa GCD920934
 Gesualdo, Quinto Libro di Madrigali. La Venexiana: Glossa GCD920935
 Gesualdo, Quinto Libro di Madrigali. The Hilliard Ensemble:  ECM New Series.  ECM 2175 476 4755
 Gesualdo, Quinto Libro di Madrigali. The Consort of Musicke, Anthony Rooley. L'Oiseau-Lyre 475 9110 DM
 Gesualdo, Sesto Libro di Madrigali. IL Complesso Barocco: Symphonia SY94133 (deleted), now Pan Classics PC10229
 Gesualdo, Sesto Libro di Madrigali. La Compagnia del Madrigale: Glossa GCD922801

Tenebrae

Other
 Il cembalo intorno a Gesualdo, Paola Erdas (harpsichord)
 Gesualdo, Sacrae Cantiones Liber Secundus. Vocalconsort Berlin, James Wood: HMC 902123

 References 

 Sources 

 
 
 
 
 
 
 
 
 
 
 
 
 

 Further reading 
 Alfred Einstein. The Italian Madrigal. Princeton University Press, 1949.
 Gustave Reese. Music in the Renaissance.  New York: W.W. Norton & Co., 1954.  
 Nicolas Slonimsky. The Concise Edition of Baker's Biographical Dictionary of Musicians, 8th ed.   New York, Schirmer Books, 1993.  
 Annibale Cogliano. Carlo Gesualdo: il principe, l'amante, la strega. Napoli: Edizioni Scientifiche Italiane, 2004. .
 Annibale Cogliano. Inventario – Centro Studi e Documentazione Carlo Gesualdo. Avellino: Elio Sellino Editore, 2004.
 Annibale Cogliano. Carlo Gesualdo omicida fra storia e mito. Napoli: ESI, 2006. .
 Salvatore La Vecchia, with a Preface by Ruggero Cappuccio. La Giostra del principe: Il dramma di Carlo Gesualdo Atripalda (AV): Mephite Editore, 2010. 
 Sandro Naglia. Il processo compositivo in Gesualdo da Venosa: un'interpretazione tonale. Rome, IkonaLiber, 2012. 
 Annibale Cogliano. Carlo Gesualdo da Venosa: Per una biografia. Giuseppe Barile, 2014 
 Joel Epstein, The Curse of Gesualdo: Music, Murder and Madness''. New York: Juwal Publications, 2020, ISBN 979-8671541731.

External links 

 La Stamperia del Principe Gesualdo (Gesualdo, Italy)
 
 
 
 Free scores at the Mutopia Project

1566 births
1613 deaths
People from Venosa
Renaissance composers
Italian classical composers
Italian male classical composers
Madrigal composers
16th-century Italian musicians
Italian murderers
17th-century Italian musicians
17th-century male musicians